Sorbus hibernica, the Irish whitebeam (fionn-choill in Irish), is a species of whitebeam endemic to Ireland. It occurs in most counties, usually as scattered individuals, or in small groups. It is sometimes treated as a species in the genus Aria, as Aria hibernica.

The IUCN has currently listed this species as a vulnerable species. Its population is currently stable.

Description
The fruits are usually wider than long.

Distribution and habitat
Sorbus hibernica is found in most Irish counties, usually in ones or twos, but with occasional larger groups. Estimates of the total population range from 250 to 1000 individuals. Most trees are in the centre of the island, with some in the north and some in the southeast. It occurs in a range of habitats including mountains, woods and cliffs on limestone, gorges, lakesides, rocky pastures, hedges, roadsides and open woodland.

Conservation
Sorbus hibernica is a very rare plant in Northern Ireland. Fewer than ten sites are known, some with a single tree. One of these locations is on cliffs near Garron Tower, County Antrim. As a result of this rarity, and its endemic status, S. hibernica is one of the Habitas Priority Species for Northern Ireland. It is also a rare plant in Ireland, with the total population estimated as being in the range 240 to 1,000 individuals. It has a widespread distribution over all of the island, but only as scattered individual trees or small clumps. The population appears to be stable, but with such a small total population, the tree is sensitive to habitat loss.

References

hibernica
Flora of Ireland